Fishboy is an American four-piece indie pop band from Denton, Texas which began as the solo project of Eric Michener. He was given the nickname while on a middle-school field trip after he was dared to pluck and swallow a fish at the Dallas World Aquarium. The band is signed to Happy Happy Birthday To Me Records in Athens, Georgia and associated with Business Deal Records, a music collective in Austin, Texas.

Their fourth album, Little D was acclaimed by the Dallas Observer and Austin Chronicle and named to a Best Local of 2005 list by the Dallas Morning News.

The band's 2007 release, Albatross: How We Failed to Save the Lone Star State with the Power of Rock and Roll, is a record which Michener calls "a rock opera about how myself, the band, and the ghost of Buddy Holly attempt to save Texas by going on a tour/crime spree in order to perform all 8,030 of the songs I've written in my sleep since I was in the womb."

In 2011, the band released Classic Creeps, described as "the first in an ongoing series of Fishboy records featuring characters whose lives interconnect to form a bigger story." Each track is listed in alphabetical order and each character's name begins with the letter A.

In 2017, Fishboy appeared on the podcast "Don't Feed the Artists" to promote their album Art Guards for Lauren Records.

Band members 
 Eric "Fishboy" Michener - Vocals, guitar
 Grahm Robinson - Drums
 Samuel Escalante - Guitar, Keys, horns
 Brooks Martin - Bass

Prior members
 Dave "Cleveland" Koen
 Adam "Sweatpants" Avramescu - Keyboard, horns, percussion
 Scarlett Wright - Bass, backup vocals
 Tommy "Medicine Ball" Garcia - Drums
 Ryan "Secret Crystal" Williams of The Baptist Generals - Bass
 Justin "Sixlets" Lloyd - Bass
 John "Christakis" Clardy of Tera Melos - Drums
 Winston Reed "Slapbracelet" Chapman of Bosque Brown and The Baptist Generals - Drums
 Brady "The Bear" Goodwin - Bass, tuba
 Drew "Albatross" Erickson of Roy G and the Biv - Drums, keys

Discography

Albums
 Zipbangboom, Business Deal Records (2003)
 Little D, Business Deal Records (2005)
 Albatross: How We Failed to Save the Lone Star State with the Power of Rock and Roll, Happy Happy Birthday To Me Records (2007), Fishstick Records, (2011)
 Classic Creeps, Happy Happy Birthday To Me Records (2011)
 An Elephant, Self Released (2014)
 Art Guards, Lauren Records (2017)
 Waitsgiving, Lauren Records (2021)

EPs
 NOM, Self Released (2009)

Singles
 Split 7" with Baby Calendar, Happy Happy Birthday To Me Records (2007)
 IMAVOLCANO 7" and comic, Lauren Records (2013)
 The Best Ever Boom Box Cassette Tape from Durham (2022)

Compilations
 I Think We Should Stay Away From Each Other, Lauren Records (2011)

Early recordings
 Tim Fly's Cause He's Having Fun, Business Deal Records (2000)
 The American Friends of Carlos Velez, Self Released (2002)

References

External links 
Official band site
Allmusic.com

Musical groups from Denton, Texas